Maria Valentina Vezzali (born 14 February 1974) is an Italian politician and retired fencer. As a fencer, Vezzali won six Olympic gold medals and was a 16-time World Champion in foil. She is one of only five athletes in the history of the Summer Olympic Games to have won five medals in the same individual event.

In 2013, Vezzali became a member of the Italian Chamber of Deputies as part of the Civic Choice party. In 2021, she became Italy's cabinet undersecretary in charge of sports.

Fencing
Vezzali was the first fencer in Olympic history to win three individual foil gold medals at three consecutive Olympics – Sydney 2000, Athens 2004 and Beijing 2008. Vezzali won nine Olympic medals in all: five in individual foil (three gold, one silver, one bronze) and four in team foil (three gold, one bronze). She medaled in all five of her Olympic appearances from 1996 to 2012; she attempted to qualify for Rio 2016 at the age of 41, but did not gain enough points. Vezzali has the third-most Olympic medals (9) of any Italian athlete and the most of any female summer Olympian from Italy, behind fencer Edoardo Mangiarotti (13) and cross-country skier Stefania Belmondo (10).

She also won sixteen gold medals at the World Fencing Championships, six in individual competitions (1999, 2001, 2003, 2005, 2007, 2011) and another ten in team competitions (1995, 1997, 1998, 2001, 2004, 2009, 2010, 2013), plus six silver medals (two individual, 1994 and 2006, and four with Italian team, in 1994, 2006, 2011, 2016) and four bronze medals (individual, 1995, 1998, 2012 and 2014).

In European championships, she won nine gold medals (individual: 1998, 1999, 2001, 2009, 2010; team: 1999, 2001, 2009, 2010), three silver medals (individual: 2003, 2007; team: 2007), two bronze medals (individual: 1993; team: 1998).

Political career
Vezzali was a member of the Italian Parliament in the XVIIth Legislatura between 2013 and 2018. She was originally a member of the Civic Choice party led by Mario Monti. In 2021, she was named cabinet undersecretary in charge of sports for Italy.
On 27 July 2022, Vezzali joined Silvio Berlusconi's Forza Italia (FI).

Prize List

Fencing World Cup
  Foil (1996, 1997, 1999, 2000, 2001, 2002, 2003, 2004, 2007, 2008, 2010)

Achievements

Olympic Games

World Championships

Honours and awards
: Grande Ufficiale Ordine al Merito della Repubblica Italiana (Italian for: Grand Officer Order of Merit of the Italian Republic), 1 September 2008.

Personal life
She published two autobiographies: A viso scoperto ("With uncovered face"), written with Caterina Luchetti in 2006, and Io, Valentina Vezzali, written with Betta Carbone in 2012. She married Italian football player Domenico Giugliano and has two sons: Pietro, born on 9 June 2005, and Andrea, born on 16 May 2013. Vezzali is Catholic.

See also
 Walk of Fame of Italian sport
List of cultural icons of Italy
List of multiple Olympic gold medalists
List of multiple Olympic medalists
List of multiple Summer Olympic medalists
List of multiple Olympic medalists in one event
Multiple medallist at the World Fencing Championships
Italian sportswomen multiple medalists at Olympics and World Championships
Italian fencer multiple medallists at the Olympics
Italian fencer multiple medallists at the World Championships
List of Scelta Civica politicians

References

External links 
 
 Valentina Vezzali at Italian Fencing Federation
  

1974 births
Living people
People from Iesi
Civic Choice politicians
Deputies of Legislature XVII of Italy
21st-century Italian women politicians
Italian Roman Catholics
Italian female fencers
Olympic fencers of Italy
Fencers at the 1996 Summer Olympics
Fencers at the 2000 Summer Olympics
Fencers at the 2004 Summer Olympics
Fencers at the 2008 Summer Olympics
Fencers at the 2012 Summer Olympics
Olympic gold medalists for Italy
Olympic silver medalists for Italy
Olympic bronze medalists for Italy
Olympic medalists in fencing
Fencers of Fiamme Oro
Medalists at the 1996 Summer Olympics
Medalists at the 2000 Summer Olympics
Medalists at the 2004 Summer Olympics
Medalists at the 2008 Summer Olympics
Medalists at the 2012 Summer Olympics
Universiade medalists in fencing
Mediterranean Games gold medalists for Italy
Mediterranean Games medalists in fencing
Competitors at the 2001 Mediterranean Games
Competitors at the 2009 Mediterranean Games
Universiade gold medalists for Italy
Universiade silver medalists for Italy
Medalists at the 1995 Summer Universiade
Medalists at the 1997 Summer Universiade
Medalists at the 1999 Summer Universiade
Medalists at the 2001 Summer Universiade
Sportspeople from the Province of Ancona
Women members of the Chamber of Deputies (Italy)